The Southern Suburbs are a group of Anglophone suburbs in Cape Town, Western Cape, South Africa. This group includes, among others, Observatory, Mowbray, Pinelands, Rosebank, Rondebosch, Rondebosch East, Newlands, Claremont, Hanover Park,Lansdowne, Kenilworth, Bishopscourt, Constantia, Wynberg, Ottery, Plumstead, Diep River, Bergvliet and Tokai. The area is also commonly referred to as the Cape Peninsula, often including the towns further South such as Fish Hoek.

Tourism
The Southern Suburbs has many popular tourist attractions and Public Spaces.

Kirstenbosch Gardens

The Kirstenbosch National Botanical Garden is one of the oldest botanical gardens in South Africa, and is situated along the Eastern Slopes of Table Mountain in the suburb of Bishopscourt. There are many unique flower species in this garden that are not to be found anywhere else in the world.

Rhodes Memorial 

The Rhodes Memorial is a popular tourist attraction on the slopes of Devil's Peak in the suburb of Rondebosch. This memorial commemorates a former British South African Politician Cecil John Rhodes. This memorial is nearby to the University of Cape Town.

Newlands Forest 

Newlands Forest is a popular forest along the slopes of Table Mountain at Newlands. It includes many hiking trails and braai area. Ruins of the old “Paradise” estate where Lady Anne Barnard lived for a portion of her stay in Cape Town lay deep within this forest.

Golf

There are a few golf courses in the Southern Suburbs. Golf courses in the region include “King David Mowbray golf club” in Mowbray, Rondebosch golf course, “Royal Cape golf club” in Ottery and the ”Steenberg golf club.”

Arderne Gardens

Arderne Gardens is a public park and arboretum tucked away from the busy Main Road in Claremont. It was established in 1845 and is a popular venue for wedding photographs.  The focus of the Arderne Gardens is the cultivation of exotic species.

History
During the Apartheid era, the Southern Suburbs were predominantly "whites only" residential areas.

Geography
Cape Town's Southern Suburbs lie to the Southeast of the slopes of Table Mountain within rich valleys and vast plains reaching from just south of the Table Bay industrial neighbourhoods in the north to the False Bay coastal suburbs and the Cape Peninsula cliffs to the south, and are crossed North-South by the M3 and M5 freeways. In general, this area is identified as being the more affluent of the Cape Town Metropolis' sections and includes some of the city's most expensive residential neighbourhoods.

Commerce
The suburb of Claremont is an important commercial hub in the Southern Suburbs and is the location of several shopping malls. Some of the well-known malls include Cavendish Square and Stadium on Main.

Demographics
The majority of the Southern Suburbs' population are White English-speaking with large minority communities of Black, Indian and Coloured people in some suburbs. Many of the non-Whites are Anglophone and speak English natively. The area has a population of 205,000 people.

Due to the large British descendant population, the area has a bigger pro-Commonwealth and pro-Monarchy (in reference to the British Monarch’s official title as Head of the Commonwealth) sentiment than the rest of the Cape. Because of this, many institutions retained their Royal patronage (such as the Royal Cape Golf Club and the Royal Cape Yacht Club) and there are many institutions related to British heritage in the region (including the Cape Town 1820 Settlers Association, Cape Town Scottish Highlander Pipe Band and Cape Town Scottish Caledonian Pipe Band). The area is also home to the Cecil Rhodes Memorial and is home to many British pubs and tea rooms. 

Due to the region being predominantly White English-South African, it is also home a very large concentration of Anglicans with many Anglican churches and Anglican private schools (most notably the St. George's Grammar School and Bishops Diocesan College).

Education
The Southern Suburbs offers many good public and private primary and high schools, and also some of the finest in the country. Most of these schools are found in Rondebosch, Newlands, Claremont and Wynberg.

List of High Schools:

•Rustenburg Girls’ High School
•Rondebosch Boys High School
•Westerford High School
•Groote Schuur High School
•South African College High Schools
•Bishops Diocesan College
•San Souci Girls’ High School
•Livingstone High School
•Windsor High School
•Herschel Girls Secondary School for girls
•Wynberg Boys’ High School
•Wynberg Girls’ High School

List of Primary Schools:

•Rustenberg Girls’ Junior School
•Oakhurst Girls’ Primary School
•Groote Schuur Primary School 
•Mickelfield School for Girls
•Golden Grove Primary School
•South African College Junior School
•Grove Primary School
•Greenfield Girls’ Primary School
•Herschel Girls Preparatory School
•Wynberg Boys’ Junior School
•Wynberg Girls’ Junior School
•Constantia Primary School

The Southern Suburbs are very popular among University students, especially between Woodstock and Wynberg, due to their proximity to the University of Cape Town. Other tertiary education institutions in the area include Varsity College, AFDA, Cape Audio College, Damelin Mowbray, and The South African School of Applied Psychology.

Language
The Southern Suburbs is a predominantly English-speaking region of Cape Town whereas the Northern Suburbs is a predominantly Afrikaans-speaking region. The Northern Suburbs lie behind the 'Boerewors Curtain' which distincts between the English-speaking Southern Suburbs and the Afrikaans-speaking Northern Suburbs.

Transport
One of the most well-known roads in the Southern Suburbs is the historic Main Road, which starts in the City Bowl and goes through Observatory, Mowbray, Rondebosch, Newlands, Claremont, Kenilworth, Wynberg, Plumstead, Diep River, Bergvliet, Muizenberg, and then onwards to Simon's Town.

References